CHMT-FM is a Canadian radio station, broadcasting at 93.1 FM in Timmins, Ontario, Canada. Owned by Vista Radio, it broadcasts a country format branded as Country 93.1.

History
The Haliburton Broadcasting Group was licensed by the CRTC in February 2001 to open up a new English-language commercial FM radio station in Timmins.

The station originally launched in 2001 as an adult contemporary station branded as Mix 93. Some current hot AC/CHR singles were dayparted into the evening and overnight periods. However, around the same time as CHMT's launch in 2001, Telemedia moved the competing CKGB to FM as well as flipping that station's format from country to AC.

CHMT briefly responded by playing at least one country song an hour; eventually, amid competition between the two stations for audience share and advertising revenue, CHMT adopted the "Moose FM" branding and a country format in 2002.

In 2005, Haliburton Broadcasting group received a license for a new FM radio station at 106.3 in North Bay, for which they proposed a format based on that of CHMT. The station launched in 2006 under the call letters CFXN.

On March 13, 2006, after a day of stunting in which it played entirely Shania Twain music, the station dropped country music for an adult hits format as The Moose 93.1 FM.

On April 5, 2011, Haliburton Broadcasting applied to the CRTC to increase CHMT-FM's signal from 3,600 to 16,400 watts, by increasing the effective height of antenna above average terrain from 75.8 to 95 metres, and by changing its class from A to B1. This was approved on June 3, 2011.

On April 23, 2012, Vista Broadcast Group, which owns a number of radio stations in western Canada, announced a deal to acquire Haliburton Broadcasting Group, in cooperation with Westerkirk Capital. The transaction was approved by the CRTC on October 19, 2012.

On May 20, 2022, at 8:00 am eastern time, the station switched its programming from a classic hits format, into a country style of broadcasting, rebranding as Country 93.1. The first song played was "Play Something Country" by Brooks and Dunn.

References

External links
Country 93.1

Hmt
Hmt
Hmt
Radio stations established in 2001
2001 establishments in Ontario